Harby is an English village and a former civil parish, now in the parish of Clawson, Hose and Harby, in the Melton district, in the county of Leicestershire. Although in Leicestershire, the county town of Leicester is further –  – than Nottingham – . The village lies on the south side of the Grantham Canal. Belvoir Castle,  to the north-east, is conspicuous on the horizon.

Location and governance
The population in 2001/2002 was listed as 864 individuals, with 698 on the electoral register and 376 houses. This increased at the 2011 census to 931 and was estimated in 2016 to be 877.

Harby is in the Rutland and Melton constituency. The current MP is the Conservative  Alicia Kearns. It shares its civil parish council with Long Clawson, and Hose. In local government it comes under Melton Borough Council and Leicestershire County Council.

There are other villages named Harby in Nottinghamshire, Denmark (Hårby) and Sweden.

History

Old names for the village include Hereby, Herdby, Hedeby, and Harteby. The first element "Har" either derives from the old Scandinavian "hiorth" meaning herd, flock, or the old Norse personal name "Herrothr", found in old Danish as "Heroth". The second element is the old Scandinavian "by", meaning a village or homestead.

The Domesday book of 1086 listed Harby as in the possession of Robert de Stafford:

Robert de Tosny. He owned 17 carucates of land at Harby. In the time of Edward the Confessor it was 14 ploughs. Three of these carucates were held directly by Robert with 8 slaves. 13 of the ploughs were leased to 24 freemen, 7 villagers and 3 smallholders. There were meadows measuring 5 furlongs long and 5 furlongs wide. This land now brought in £5 a year; it used to be £4. Robert de Bucy owns 1 carucute of land at Harby and leases it to Gerard. The land takes 1 plough to work it. Gerard sub-leases it to 2 freeman and 3 smallholders. Its value is 5 shillings.

In 1622 William Burton described in his book The Description of Leicester Shire (page 127).

"Harby, in olde deedes written Herdeby in the Hundred of Framland, standing in the Vale of Bever upon the border of Nottinghamshire. In the 20. yeere of Edward the third, William Lord Ros, and John de Oreby held lands heere. In the 44. yeere of Edward the third, Roger Delaware was Lord of this Mannor. In the 25. of Henry the eight the Lord Delaware was Lord of this Mannor as it appeareth by an Inquisition taken after the death of Sir John Digby Knight, in the said 25.yeere of Henry the eight, where it was found that the said Sir John Digby held 4. messuages (with the appurtenances in Harby) of the said Lord Delaware, as of his Mannor of Harby. In this Towne was borne Jeffrey de Hardby a famous Dvuine, brought up in Oxford, and after became one of the Canons of the Abbey of Leicester; from whence he came to be Confessor to King Edward the third, and was by him made one of his Privy Council of state. He wrote many books of special note in Divinity, and died in London, and was buried in the Austin Fryers. Here also was borne Robert de Hardby, a Frier Carmelite in Lincolne, who wrote something in praise of the saide Order, and lived 1450. Ecclesia de Herdeby Patronus Willimus de Albaniaco persona Mr.Robertus  institutes per Hug.nunc Episcopum Lincoln. The new Patron of this Church is Francis Earle of Rutland. This Rectory is valued in the King's books at 20 pounds."

In 1815 John Nichols (printer) described Harby in his book The History and Antiquities of the County of Leicestershire.

"Harby... is destitute of woods and streams; no high road leads through or beside it. A heavy clay spreads over every acre in the parish and the uniform operations of husbandry give a sameness to the country, which a stranger might view with disgust; but cultivation has made it fruitful.... Industry here makes the prospect, and the product alone is the beauty of the soil. There are about 1800 acres in the parish; and, whilst the field continued open, the method of tillage was, first-year fallow; second, barley and wheat; third, beans and pease. The families of Harby are 60, its inhabitants 322, among whom are many small freeholders. There is no mansion or ancient building in the village; but the present rector has lately built a neat and convenient house...."

In 1831 the Reverend John Curtis described Harby in his book - A Topographical History of the County of Leicester
  
Harby, Herdebi, Hertebi
In 1535 the Rectory was valued at £201. The parish was inclosed in 1790. 
At the general survey in 1086, Robert de Todenei (Robert de Todeni) held 17 carucates, 3 ploughs were in the demesne; 8 bondmen, 24 socmen, 7 villans and 3 bordars, had 13 ploughs; there was a meadow 200 perches long and 160 broads.
Gerard held under Robert de Buci 1 carucate, the land was equal to 1 plough, which was held by 3 bordars and 2 socmen.
In 1297 Lambert de Tryckenham held 2 Virgates.
In 1302 Robert Tateshall held half a fee.
In 1343 William Ros, of Hamlake, held a fee. 
In 1363 Margery Ros held a fee and the advowson. 
In 1370 Roger le Warre and Alianora, his wife, held the manor.
In 1391 Simon Pakeman and Agnes, his wife held 12 messuages.
In 1394 Maria, wife of John de Ros held one-eighth of a fee.
In 1396 Robert Hauberk, an outlaw, held 1 messuage and 7 bovates. 
In 1412 John West held the manor.
In 1416 Thomas West held the manor.
In 1427 Sir Reginald West, Lord Delawarre, held it.
In 1450 Reginald West held it. Edward IV. granted lands here to William Hastings, and in 1481 he held lands and messuage and Gracedieu Priory held lands. 
In 1552 William Brabazon held half the manor.
In 1642 Andrew Collins held it, whose family sold it to the Earl of Rutland.

In 1931 the parish had a population of 608. On 1 April 1936 the civil parish was merged with Hose and Long Clawson to form "Clawson and Harby", which is now called Clawson, Hose and Harby.

Primary school

 Harby Church of England Primary School began as a church school founded by the National Society for Promoting Religious Education. It opened under the Rector, William Evans Hartopp, in about 1827, on land donated by John Manners, 5th Duke of Rutland.

A new school building opened on 25 March 1861, probably on the site of a village green, under a church committee headed by Rev. Manners Octavius Norman, at a cost of £861 3s 4d. The surveyors and architects were Bellamy and Hardy of Lincoln. It had two main teaching classrooms, a large kitchen, toilets to the rear, and accommodation for the teacher consisting of a downstairs study and three upper rooms. The first headmaster was Henry Major. The county council took over management on 1 July 1903.

Originally there was a bell tower above the front door, of which only the base remains intact. A swan (as an emblem of the school) and a book are carved on either side of the base. In 1976 the school was extended with three new open-plan classroom areas. One old schoolroom was converted into a studio and TV room. A new kitchen was built at the rear and a boiler house in the style of the old school added.

A letter from the Rt Hon. Nick Gibb MP, Minister of State for School Standards, sent in February 2018, states that the school was in the top 1 per cent of primary schools in England for attainment in reading and writing, based in 2017 KS2 results. The school has just under 100 pupils aged 4 to 11. Harby Pre-School has closed. However, the latest full Ofsted report in March 2019 was critical in some respects.

Methodist chapel
 Methodists had begun to hold services from 1769 in their homes, and then in an old coach house given by William Orson for chapel conversion in April 1828. By 1847 the Wesleyan congregation had outgrown the coach house, which was replaced by a chapel built on Orson's land. The foundation stone was laid by C. H. Clark, a Nottingham solicitor, and opening sermons were preached by Rev. John Rattenbury and Rev. James Everett. In 1874 it was refurbished.

In 1926 a new two-manual pipe organ by E. Wragg & Son of Nottingham was installed at a cost of £210, but it was removed when the chapel was modernised for its current use by the Vale Christian Fellowship.

Parish church

 The Parish church at Harby is dedicated to St Mary the Virgin.

The earliest church on the site was probably made of wood, of which there is evidence in the west wall of the nave. The earliest written notice appears in the records of the Bishop of Lincoln, recording a priest at Harby in 1220 called Robert. In the 13th century, the present stone tower was built at the west end of the nave and the wooden nave and chancel were rebuilt in stone. The nave was widened, so that its walls joined the tower at the west end, on the outer edges of the tower buttresses.

The chancel roof was raised in about 1350 and new windows were added.

The first window in the north wall of the chancel nearest to the nave has three panes showing the letter W or VV. It stands for "Virgo virginum", "virgin of virgins" for the dedication of the church to the Blessed Virgin Mary. This is the only stained glass in the building. We do not know if this is left from Mediaeval times when all other stained glass was deliberately removed, or dates from after the Reformation in 1539.

A Victorian restoration took place in 1874–1876, the flagstone flooring being replaced by tiles. New pews in the chancel were decorated in the Gothic style. In 1874 the roof was renewed. In 1903, a vestry was built and the organ was placed to face into the chancel. The font was moved again to the east end of the north aisle.

On the wall above the arch at the east end of the nave are four panels. The middle two are wooden boards. One has the coat of arms of George II (reigned 1727–1760). The board above bears the inscription "Fear God, Honour the King". The other two panels show the ten commandments on canvas in wooden frames.

On 29 May 1839 William Aubrey de Vere Beauclerk, 9th Duke of St. Albans (1801–1849) married Elizabeth Catherine Gubbins the daughter of Maj. Gen. Joseph Gubbins (1785–1817). As a celebration, he donated to the church a new clock, a bible, a prayer book, and £30 with the rector to be invested for the poor.
This marriage was held at Harby because Elizabeth Catherine Gubbins was the first Cousin to Eliza Georgiana Gubbins who was the first wife of the Rector William Evens Hartopp.
Eliza Georgiana Gubbins father was George Stamer Gubbins of Kilfrush, Co. Limerick. His Brother was Maj. Gen. Joseph Gubbins of Kilfrush, Co. Limerick. His daughter was Elizabeth Catherine Gubbins.
 
Harby Church became a Grade II* listed building in 1968.

Bells
There are five bells in the tower dating from as early as 1610.

Pipe organ
The organ in Harby parish church as listed on the National Pipe Organ Register. Was initially built by Thomas Elliot and installed at Gedling Parish Church, Nottinghamshire by Elliot's foreman Alexander Buckingham in 1808. The organ was probably built at Elliot's works in Tottenham Court Road, London with his business partner John Nutt. It was removed from Gedling at a cost of more than £80 and transported to Harby in 1874, where it was first installed at an additional cost of £11 in the northeast corner of the north aisle, where the font stands now. When a new vestry was built in 1903, the organ was moved to face north into the chancel choir.

The organ has been maintained by Hawkins, organ builders of Walsall, West Midlands, who were initially requested to quote for an electric blower in 1945. Thereafter they overhauled and cleaned the organ in 1956 and 1975.

Font 
The font is from the Decorated period and presumably stood in the pre-Reformation position by the front door, in line with Catholic practice. The date 1606 may indicate when it was moved. After the Reformation, the font was moved again into the centre of the church and remained there until 1834.
The font now stands in the northeast corner of the north aisle where the organ sat before the vestry was built in 1901.

Parish registers
The parchment skins of an early volume of Harby Parish Registers, long lost, are said to have been unstitched and wrapped around the trunk and limbs of the corpse of Anne Adcock, and so buried by her grandson, John Adcock, a man of eccentric character, in December 1776.
Some transcripts exist at Lincoln for the years 1604, 1606 to 1609 and 1618; and at Leicester for 1581, 1612–1613, 1617, 1621, 1625–1629, 1632–1634, 1636–1638, 1661–1663, 1670, 1672, 1674–1683, 1685, 1687–1688, 1690–1691 and 1694–1700.

Incumbents

Notable people
Samuel Levis, born in Harby on 30 September 1649, son of Christopher Levis, was married on 4 May 1680 to Elizabeth Claytor. He received a Quaker certificate of removal in July 1684 and arrived in Pennsylvania by 4 November 1684. Levis died between 4 October 1728 (the date of his will) and 13 April 1734 (date of probate).
Harby farm labourer Kemp, born in 1884, was recorded in 1956 by the University of Leeds, talking about sheep shearing, washing, dipping and the price of a fleece.

Amenities
Harby has a post office, a village shop and a cafe, all located at the village garage in Nether Street. The nearest centre for trade, medical services and other amenities is Melton Mowbray.

War memorial

 The war memorial cross was erected in honour of the Harby soldiers and sailors who participated in the First World War.

The accepted plans were drawn up by Mr T. Burbidge and the work was entrusted to Mr S. Squires of Bingham. The height is nearly 15 ft, the lower of the two bases being 8 ft square. The stone above is 4 ft square and 2 ft in height, containing 99 names, 19 on the front face being those who were killed in action or died on service. The remaining 80 are those who enlisted from the village and survived.

Surrounding this stone is an old shaft and base from an ancient village cross, capped with a new cross suggesting what the original may have looked like, drawn by a former rector, Rev. Manners Octavius Norman. The whole, old and new, is of Portland stone. This relic of the old village cross stood originally on the village green, some yards from its present position. It was moved to the churchyard when the school was built in 1860. The arrow marks where the new cross was fitted to the old. The steel brace which joins the two parts together was made by Mr. Martin Stead, the village blacksmith."

The unveiling ceremony on the night of Thursday, 20 May 1920, was performed by the Rev. E. H. Stone, Rector, in the presence of 200 people and of the church and chapel choirs. Sixty ex-servicemen formed a guard of honour. The text runs: ERECTED BY THE PARISHIONERS IN MEMORY OF THOSE WHO FOUGHT IN THE GREAT WAR 1914 – 1919. OFFERED UPON THE ALTAR OF THE NATION

After the 1939–1945 war, two names of men who did not return were carved on the base.

AND IN MEMORY OF THOSE WHO DIED IN THE 2ND WORLD WAR 1939 – 1945

Public houses
Originally there were three:
The Marquis of Granby stood opposite the junction of Boyers Orchard in Stathern Lane, as one of many named after John Manners, Marquess of Granby. Now a private house, it ceased trading some time between 1871 and 1881.
The White Hart in Main Street traded opposite the Nags Head, both being managed by Home Breweries of Nottingham. It was demolished in 2005 and its site used for housing.
The Nags Head, as the survivor, is one of the oldest buildings in the village and reputedly one of the oldest pubs in Leicestershire. It may once have been a priest house: evidence of a priest hole can be seen in one of the upper rooms. It forms one of the best examples of early timber-frame construction in the area.

Transport
London is  via the M1 motorway.

The village is served by the No. 24 bus between Melton Mowbray and Bottesford or Bingham.

Harby and Stathern railway station opened in 1879 and closed in 1962.

The wharf of Grantham Canal was formerly used to ship grain from the village mill in Colston Lane, but is now closed.

References

External links

Village Website
Harby Village Hall Website

Villages in Leicestershire
Former civil parishes in Leicestershire
Borough of Melton